Yuan Huazhi (born October 1961) is an admiral (shangjiang) of the People's Liberation Army Navy (PLAN). He has been Political Commissar of the People's Liberation Army Navy since January 2022. He attained the rank of rear admiral (shaojiang) in July 2015, and was promoted to the rank of vice admiral (zhongjiang) in December 2019 and admiral (shangjiang) in January 2022.

Biography
Yuan was born in Xiantao, Hubei in October 1961. He enlisted in the People's Liberation Army (PLA) in 1978. He served in the People's Liberation Army Navy (PLAN) for a long time. In December 2015 he became Political Commissar of the People's Liberation Army Naval Research Institute, replacing Li Daoming. He was Political Commissar of the People's Liberation Army Navy Marine Corps in March 2017, and held that office until December 2018, when he was transferred to the People's Liberation Army Air Force and appointed Political Commissar of the Eastern Theater Command Air Force. In March 2019 he was promoted to become Deputy Political Commissar of the People's Liberation Army Navy. In January 2022, he was promoted again to become Political Commissar of the People's Liberation Army Navy.

References

External links

1961 births
Living people
People from Xiantao
People's Liberation Army Navy admirals